Raymond Allen Braithwaite  (born 6 December 1933) is a former Australian politician.

Born at Finch Hatton, Queensland, he was a chartered accountant before entering politics. In 1964 he was elected to Mackay City Council, where he remained until 1969. He also served in the military. In 1975, he was elected to the Australian House of Representatives as the National Country Party member for Dawson, defeating Labor minister Rex Patterson. He held the seat until his retirement in 1996.

In his valedictory speech in parliament, Braithwaite thanked the ALP for nominating candidates against him in Dawson who were easy for him to beat at every election he contested.

References

1933 births
Living people
National Party of Australia members of the Parliament of Australia
Members of the Australian House of Representatives for Dawson
Members of the Australian House of Representatives
Recipients of the Medal of the Order of Australia
20th-century Australian politicians